Eula is a feminine given name. Notable people with the name include:

 Eula Beal, American opera singer
 Eula Bingham, American scientist
 Eula Biss, American writer
 Eula Caballero, Filipina actress
 Eula Hall, American activist
 Eula Love, American crime victim
 Eula Davis McEwan, American paleontologist
 Eula Valdez, Filipina actress
 Eula Lawrence, a fictional playable character in the game Genshin Impact

See also
 Eula (disambiguation)

Feminine given names